Jin Kim is a South Korean Baroque violinist.

A native of Seoul, she studied in Seoul National University's Department of Music, and then came to the United States to study at the University of Michigan under Ruggiero Ricci. She learned Baroque violin from Sigiswald Kuijken, a Belgian violinist and conductor noted for authentic instruments, and has performed in Europe, the United States and Japan. Currently, she devotes herself to the promotion of early music in South Korea.

She has worked with period instrument ensemble La Petite Bande. As a founder, she has been leading Musica Glorifica since 2002.

Instruments 
Jin Kim currently plays a violin made in Absam in 1656 by Jacob Stainer.

Recordings 
Handel – Sonatas For Violin & Basso Continuo, with Musica Glorificaa (2007)
Psalms for you – 17th century Italian music, with Musica Glorifica (2002)
Bach – St Matthew Passion BWV 244, with La Petite Bande (2010) Challenge Classics
Bach – Cantatas, BWV 13 – 73 – 81 – 144, with La Petite Bande (2008) ACCENT

Sources 
Jin Kim at MusicaGlorifica.com
Jin Kim at JinKimViolin.com

References

South Korean violinists
Performers of early music
Baroque-violin players
Living people
Year of birth missing (living people)
Seoul National University alumni
University of Michigan alumni
South Korean expatriates in the United States
Musicians from Seoul
21st-century violinists